Dixmude or Diksmuide, Belgian city.

Dixmude may also refer to:

 Alphonse Jacques de Dixmude
 French ship Dixmude, three units of the French Navy have been named after the Battle of the Yser
 Dixmude (airship) in French service, previously known as Zeppelin LZ 114